John Jumper may refer to:
 John Jumper (Seminole chief), principal chief of the Seminole Nation
 John P. Jumper, United States Air Force general
 John Jumper (AI researcher)